Racola is an unincorporated community in Washington County, in the U.S. state of Missouri.

History
A post office called Racola was established in 1898, and remained in operation until 1930. The community has the middle name of John Racola Coleman, the original owner of the site.

References

Unincorporated communities in Washington County, Missouri
Unincorporated communities in Missouri